State Route 134 (SR 134) is an east-west state highway in southeastern Tennessee. The  state route traverses portions of southern Marion and southwestern Hamilton Counties. It travels along a path from Haletown to the Georgia state line.

Route description 
SR 134 begins at an intersection with US 41 (SR 2) during that highway’s concurrency with US 64 and US 72. From Haletown, the highway travels east-southeastward to have an intersection with SR 156 before passing through the small community of Whiteside, and entering extreme southwestern Hamilton County before crossing the Georgia state line, where the roadway continues as Georgia State Route 299 (SR 299) within only minutes from that highway’s intersection with Interstate 24 (I-24) in Dade County, Georgia.

Major intersections

See also

References 
Mileage retrieved from DeLorme Street Atlas USA 
Official Tennessee Highway Maps

External links
Tennessee Department of Transportation

134
134
134